CarDon & Associates owns and operates senior housing and rehabilitation communities in central and southern Indiana. It is one of the largest such companies in the state, with 20 senior centers and approximately 3,000 employees. It is family-owned with main offices in Bloomington and Fishers. The company has more than 2,000 residents and annual revenues of $170 million as of 2013.

History

The company was founded in 1977 by Carroll and Donna Moore with the opening of a senior community in Franklin, Indiana. The company continued to expand over the years, either by building new facilities or acquiring them from other companies. All six of the Moores’ children worked at the Greenwood center while growing up, and most continue to be active in running the company today.

Carroll and Donna Moore turned over operations to their children in 2000. Dr. Stephen Moore, who is also a licensed physician, currently holds the titles of Chief Executive Officer and President, and three of his siblings join him on the board of directors.

Facilities

CarDon & Associates operates senior communities in the following Indiana counties: Brown, Dubois, Greene, Hamilton, Hendricks, Johnson, Madison, Marion, Monroe, Orange and Vanderburgh. CarDon offers a variety of living environments that vary from location to location, including assisted living, memory care, independent living, skilled nursing, long-term care and rehabilitation. Two more senior communities are set to open in 2015.

References

External links 
 CarDon & Associates website

Companies based in Bloomington, Indiana
Privately held companies based in Indiana